Mesoderm posterior protein 2 (MESP2), also known as class C basic helix-loop-helix protein 6 (bHLHc6), is a protein that in humans is encoded by the MESP2 gene.

Function 

This gene encodes a member of the bHLH family of transcription factors and plays a key role in defining the rostrocaudal patterning of somites via interactions with multiple Notch signaling pathways. This gene is expressed in the anterior presomitic mesoderm and is downregulated immediately after the formation of segmented somites. This gene also plays a role in the formation of epithelial somitic mesoderm and cardiac mesoderm. In zebrafish, the homolog mesp-b is critical for dermomyotome development.

Clinical significance 

Mutations in the MESP2 gene cause autosomal recessive Spondylocostal dysostosis type 2.

References

Further reading 

 
 
 
 
 

Transcription factors